Peripatopsis bolandi is a species of velvet worm in the family Peripatopsidae.  This species is a clade in the P. balfouri species complex and ranges from 18 mm to 22 mm in length. Also known as the Boland velvet worm, this species is found in the Hottentots Holland Mountain region in South Africa.

References

Endemic fauna of South Africa
Onychophorans of temperate Africa
Onychophoran species
Animals described in 2013